Rati Pandey is an Indian actress known for her performances in Hitler Didi, Miley Jab Hum Tum, Porus, Devi Adi Parashakti, Begusarai, Har Ghar Kuch Kehta Hai and Shaadi Mubarak.

Early life and background
Rati Pandey was born in a Hindu Brahmin family on 11 September 1982 in Assam, India. She lived there for seven years and then her family moved to Patna, Bihar where she studied at St. Karen's High School, Patna. Sushant Singh Rajput's elder sister used to be her classmate. She completed schooling from the Kendriya Vidyalaya school, Sadiq Nagar, New Delhi. Rati graduated from the Miranda House College at Delhi University specializing in Economics.

Career
Rati Pandey started her career as a participant in the reality show Idea Zee Cinestars ki Khoj in 2006. She also appeared in Sony TV's crime based thriller C.I.D, and Sahara One's horror show Raat Hone Ko Hai. She has appeared in TV commercial of Champions Appliances as well.

Rati's television career continued with Deepti Bhatnagar's Shaadi Street on STAR One, in which she played the lead role "Nandini". After that, she played the lead role of Prarthna Thakraal in Zee TV's show Har Ghar Kuch Kehta Hai produced by Shreya Creations.

In 2008, she got the role of Nupur Bhushan in the show Miley Jab Hum Tum. Nupur was a bubbly girl who became popular with fans; when the producers wrote the character out of the show, the show's fans convinced them to let Nupur return to the show.

After the end of Miley Jab Hum Tum in 2010, Rati participated in the dance reality show Nachle Ve with Saroj Khan on NDTV Imagine. She also participated in a travel-based reality show on Star Plus called Ritz Jee Le Ye Pal.

In 2011, Pandey was offered a lead role in the show Hitler Didi opposite Sumit Vats. She portrayed several different characters in the show.

Apart from daily soaps, Rati has also appeared in reality shows including Laughter Ke Phatke and Zara Nachke Dikha on STAR One, SAB TV's show Movers and Shakers (Hosted by Shekhar Suman), Colors TV's Bigg Boss 6 Grand Finale (Hosted by Salman Khan) and Sony TV's Comedy Circus. She has also been part of Zee Rishton ki Antakshari 2012.

Rati hosted the 10th Indian Television Academy Awards in 2010 along with Arjun Bijlani. She also hosted Zee TV's 20th Diwali Special Episode and a brief segment of Zee Rishtey Awards 2012 together with Rithvik Dhanjani.

After a sabbatical of two years, Pandey returned to television in 2016 with Begusarai, where she played 'Komal'. In the same year, she was also seen in a special cameo appearance on TV show 'Tenali Rama' as Princess Devyani.

In 2017, she portrayed the role of Queen Anusuya in Sony TV's Porus. In 2019, Pandey played the role of Vidya in Star Plus's Divya Drishti.

In October 2020, she took the replacement lead female role of Star Plus’s Shaadi Mubarak opposite Manav Gohil which was played by Rajshree Thakur.

Filmography

Television

Guest appearances

References

External links

Living people
1982 births
Actresses from Assam
Indian television actresses
Indian soap opera actresses
Actresses in Hindi television
Kendriya Vidyalaya alumni
21st-century Indian actresses